Sinan Reis, also Ciphut Sinan, (Sinan Rais; , Sinan Rayyis;) "Sinan the Chief", and  , "Sinan the Jew", was a Barbary corsair who sailed under the famed Ottoman admiral Hayreddin Barbarossa.

Life
While Ottoman sources are generally silent about his origins, most modern works assert that he was born to a Sephardic Jewish family which fled Spain or Portugal and possibly relocated to the then Ottoman ruled Smyrna, Sinan sailed as a Barbary corsair, a type of privateer or pirate, under the Ottoman flag. There are several cases of Jews who upon fleeing Iberia turned to attacking the Empire's shipping, a profitable strategy of revenge for the Inquisition's religious persecution.

There are other sources though which claim that Sinan's epithet, "the Jew" does not refer to his Jewish origins. The sixteenth-century chronicler Francisco Lopez Gomarra argued that he was named so because he once escaped from an encounter with Christian ships while the nineteenth-century editor of his text speculated, not so quite understandably, that interest in astrology earned him his nickname.

Sinan was based out of Mediterranean points including Santorini, and fought in several key battles against the Spanish and the Holy Roman Empire, at the time ruled by the same man, Charles V.

The English State Papers of 1533 bear evidences of his actions:

His moniker "the Great Jew", appears in a 1528 reference by the Governor of Portuguese India, who mistakenly believed that Sinan was sent by Suleiman the Magnificent to aid the King of Calicut.

Sinan sailed under the famed Ottoman admiral Hayreddin Barbarossa at the 1538 Battle of Preveza against Charles' Imperial fleet and its commander, Andrea Doria. Sinan suggested landing troops at Actium on the Gulf of Arta near Preveza, an idea which Barbarossa initially opposed, but which later proved to be important for securing the Ottoman victory.

Around 1540, Sinan's son was traveling by sea to meet him after one of Sinan's victories. The boy was taken captive by Emperor Charles' forces and was ultimately handed over to the Lord of Elba, who baptized him and raised him at court.  Barbarossa made several unsuccessful attempts to ransom Sinan's son. While sailing nearby in 1544, Barbarossa sent an envoy to Elba to again attempt to free the boy. The island's Lord replied that his "religious scruples forbade him to surrender a baptized Christian to an infidel". Infuriated, Barbarossa landed men at Piombino, sacked the town, and blew up the fort, after which the ruler agreed to release his "boy-favorite".  The news from Barbarossa reached Sinan at Suez on the Red Sea, where the "Great Jew" was constructing a fleet to aid an Indian ruler expel the Portuguese.

Sinan (the pirate) is not the Sinan buried in a Jewish cemetery in Albania, because that refers to the grave of Kapudan Sinan (Sinanüddin Yusuf) Pasha (admiral of the Ottoman fleet 1550–1553) who lies buried near his mosque in Üsküdar (Istanbul). (The Turkish word for Scutari in Albania is also Üsküdar).

See also

 Samuel Pallache
 Barbary slave trade

References
 Reference by the Vatican Legate

Barbary pirates
16th-century people from the Ottoman Empire
Sephardi Jews from the Ottoman Empire
16th-century Sephardi Jews